Erigeron formosissimus is a North American species of flowering plants in the family Asteraceae known by the common name beautiful fleabane.

Erigeron formosissimus is native to the western United States. It has been found in Arizona, New Mexico, Utah, Colorado, Wyoming, the Black Hills of South Dakota, eastern Idaho, and southern Montana.

Erigeron formosissimus is a perennial herb up to 55 centimeters (22 inches) in height, spreading by means of underground rhizomes. It produces 1-6 flower heads per stem, each head as many as 150 white, pink, purple, or blue ray florets surrounding numerous yellow disc florets.

Varieties
Erigeron formosissimus var. viscidus (Rydberg) Cronquist - Arizona, Colorado, New Mexico, South Dakota, Wyoming
Erigeron formosissimus var. formosissimus - Arizona, Colorado, New Mexico, South Dakota, Utah

References

External links
Photo of herbarium specimen at Missouri Botanical Garden, collected in New Mexico in 1897, isotype of Erigeron formosissimus

formosissimus
Flora of the Western United States
Plants described in 1898
Flora without expected TNC conservation status